Blackall is a rural town and locality in the Blackall-Tambo Region, Queensland, Australia. In the  the locality of Blackall had a population of 1,416 people.

The town is the service centre for the Blackall-Tambo Region. The dominant industry in the area is grazing with over 70 homesteads in the locality (as at 2020).

Yalleroi is another town in the north of the locality.

Geography 
The town is situated on the Barcoo River and Landsborough Highway (Matilda Highway).

The locality contains numerous mountains, including:

 Battery Knob 
 Carlton Hill 
 Cory Peak 
 Flat Top
 Joey Peak 
 Lorne Mountain 
 Mount Battery 
 Mount Calder 
 Mount Conebreak 
 Mount Cullen 
 Mount Harden
 Mount Mistake
 Mount Northampton 
 Mount Sentinel 
 Mount Watson
 Mountain Red
 One Stone Hill 
 One Tree Hill
 Scrubby Mountain
 The Cone 
 The Nob

History
Bidjara (also known as Bidyara, Pitjara, and Peechara) is an Australian Aboriginal language spoken by the Bidjara people. The Bidjara language region includes the local government area of the Shire of Murweh, particularly the towns of Charleville, Augathella and Blackall as well as the properties of Nive Downs and Mount Tabor.

Kuungkari (also known as Kungkari and Koonkerri) is a language of Western Queensland. The Kuungkari language region includes the landscape within the local government boundaries of Longreach Region and Blackall-Tambo Region.

Gungabula (also known as Kongabula and Khungabula) is an Australian Aboriginal language of the headwaters of the Dawson River in Central Queensland. The language region includes areas within the local government area of Maranoa Region, particularly the towns of Charleville, Augathella and Blackall and as well as the Carnarvon Range.

The region was explored in 1846 by explorer Sir Thomas Mitchell and his party. In 1856, Augustus Gregory passed through the area noting that the landscape was a vast plain lacking vegetation, in contrast to Mitchell's description of good country. Blackall was named by Surveyor Abraham H. May after Sir Samuel Blackall, the second Governor of Queensland. During the 1860s the town developed as a service centre for the surrounding pastoral properties. A survey of town allotments was conducted in 1868.

Barcoo Post Office opened on 1 April 1864. It was renamed Blackall in 1868.

Blackall State School opened on 10 September 1877. On 5 October 1964, the school was destroyed by fire, but was subsequently rebuilt.

On Tuesday 29 March 1881, following seven inches of rain, the river burst through the town embankment, completely washing away the stonework of the dam. On Wednesday 30 March, the still-rising river flooded the town's main street and many people in the town's lower-lying areas were forced to evacuate as their homes became fully submerged.

Blackall was one of the first Queensland towns to sink an artesian bore in 1885. It supplies the town with water from the Great Artesian Basin. The water temperature is 58 degrees Celsius. There is an artesian spa bath at the aquatic centre and locally produced soft drinks are made from the artesian water.

The first Methodist church in Blackall opened on Easter Sunday 13 April 1884. On Thursday 23 January 1913 a new Methodist church opened. The present church building (now the Blackall Uniting Church) was established circa 1956–1958.

Blackall claims to be the home of the original Black Stump, which marks the original Astro Station established in 1887. Places west of this point are said to be 'beyond the black stump'. The Black Stump was moved from its original location to make it more accessible to tourists, and can now be found on the boundary of the Blackall State School grounds, Thistle Street, Blackall. Blackall has many attractions for public use and entertainment, including the Blackall showground, the local pool and the historic Blackall Woolscour.

In December 1890 the Australian Labour Federation’s executive met in Blackall to draw up plans for a proper organisational structure for the Labour Party. Four years earlier, in December 1886, the first meeting of the first shearers’ union, which later became the Australian Labor Party, took place in Blackall. This is commemorated by the Australian Labor Federation Memorial in Short Street.

In Australian folklore, the best known citizen of the town was the sheep shearer Jack Howe. In 1892, he shore a total of 321 sheep at Alice Downs station in 7 hours and 40 minutes, a record for hand shearing that still stands, and was only broken by a shearer using a machine driven handpiece in 1950.

The Blackall and Yaraka railway line branched off from the Central Western railway at Jericho. The line opened to Blackall in 1908 and ran all the way to Yaraka. the Jericho – Yaraka branch line closed on 14 October 2005 and has since been dismantled. Former stations on the line (now all abandoned) within the locality were (from Jericho heading south):

 Ballast railway siding
 Lancevale railway station
 Yalleroi railway station
Glenusk railway station
 Sandy Creek railway siding
 Blackall Wool Scour railway siding
Blackall railway station
Glenstuart railway station
 Malvernton railway station
Benlidi railway station
Mekaree railway station

St Joseph's Catholic Primary School was established in 1917 by the Sisters of St Joseph. The opening ceremonies were conducted on Saturday 21 July 1917 by Archbishop James Duhig.

The Blackall War Memorial commemorates those soldiers who died in World War I. The memorial was dedicated on 25 April (Anzac Day) 1927 by James Charles Minnis (former mayor of Blackall and a former soldier). The honour roll of those who died in World War II was added later.

According to information published by the Blackall Shire Council, the Cominos opened a café in the 1920s in Shamrock Street, Blackall which they called the Central. A few years later it was taken over by the Logos Brothers who installed a newsagency at one side. The Queensland Country Women's Association met at the cafe to farewell their secretary Mrs R.A.G. Malcolm in September 1929.

Blackall Ambulance commenced operations in November 1923 led by Superintendent W.J. King (from Rockhampton). On 15 October 1927 the first permanent building was officially opened by the Mick Kirwan (the Queensland Minister for Public Works) assisted by Frank Bulcock, the local Member of the Queensland Legislative Assembly for Barcoo. On 14 April 1984 the current building in Coronation Drive was officially opened by Roy Hauff.

Blackall Methodist Church – This stone was set by – Mr F J Green – To the memory of the – Pioneers of the District – and dedicated to the – Glory of God – by the Rev S J R Murr L Th – on 8 February 1958 – The Rev J L Savage, Minister.

A plaque records: (This has discrepancies with the original foundation stone) Blackall Methodist Church – This stone was set by – Mr F J Green – To the memory of the – Pioneers of the District – and dedicated to the – Glory of God – by the Rev S J Murr Lth – on 8 February 1956 – The Rev J L Savage, Minister.

Blackall's population was more than 3,000 in 1965. A declining population has coincided with the decline in the wool industry in the district.

At the 2011 census, Blackall had a population of 1,588.

The new Blackall Hospital opened on 25 November 2020. It cost $20.11 million.

Heritage listings
Blackall has a number of heritage-listed sites, including:
 Blackall Masonic Temple, Hawthorn Street

Education 
Blackall State School is a government primary and secondary (Prep-12) school for boys and girls at the corner of Hawthorne Street and Shamrock Street. In 2012, there were 152 students enrolled with 14.5 teachers. In 2018, the school had an enrolment of 111 students with 13 teachers (11 full-time equivalent) and 17 non-teaching staff (10 full-time equivalent).

St Joseph's Catholic Primary School is a Catholic primary (Kindergarten-6) school for boys and girls at 109 Thistle Street. In 2018, the school had an enrolment of 69 students with 7 teachers (5 full-time equivalent) and 4 non-teaching staff (2 full-time equivalent).

Facilities 
Blackall Police Station is at 139 Shamrock Street, access via Violet Street.

Blackall Fire Station is at 125 Shamrock Street.

Blackall Hospital is a public hospital at 31 Hospital Road. Prior to July 2014 it was known as the Black Stump Medical Centre.

Blackall Ambulance Station is at 4 Coronation Drive.

Blackall Cemetery is on Evora Road. Legendary shearer Jackie Howe is buried there.

Amenities 
Blackall has a showground, racecourse, bowling club and aquatic centre, cultural centre and an historical association.

The Blackall-Tambo Regional Council operates a public library at 108 Shamrock Street with Internet access provided through a High-Speed ISDN Connection to Brisbane (powered through the National Broadband Network).

Blackall Cultural Centre is on the south-east corner of Shamrock Street and Hawthorne Street.

The Blackall branch of the Queensland Country Women's Association has its rooms at 14 Clematis Street.

Blackall Uniting Church is at 28 Clematis Street.

The Blackall Golf Club has an 18-hole golf course at 192 Shamrock Street.

Media 
Blackall is serviced by a number of radio stations:

 West FM (Resonate Radio) – 95.1 FM
 Classic Hits 4LG (Resonate Radio) – 100.7 FM
 ABC Radio National – 107.9 FM

The Australian Broadcasting Corporation transmits ABC Television and its sister channels ABC Kids/ABC TV Plus, ABC Me and ABC News to Blackall through its Blackall relay station, ABBLQ

The Seven Network and its sister stations 7Two, 7Mate and 7Flix transmit to Blackall through its regional area affiliate, ITQ

The Nine Network and its sister channels 9Gem, 9Go! and 9Rush transmit to Blackall through its regional area affiliate, Imparja Television

Network Ten and its sister channels 10 BOLD, 10 Peach and 10 Shake transmit to Blackall through its regional area affiliate, CDT

The Special Broadcasting Service and its sister channels SBS Viceland, SBS World Movies and SBS Food also transmit to Blackall

Attractions 
The Black Stump is in Thistle Street behind the Blackall State School.

The Major Mitchell Memorial is in the centre of Shamrock Street (opposite Short Street). It commemorates Thomas Mitchell's exploration of the district.

The Australian Labor Federation Memorial is at the intersection of Shamrock Street and Short Street. It commemorates the meeting of shearers that led to the foundation of the Australian Labor Party.

Blackall Memorial Park is on the south-east corner of Shamrock Street and Hawthorne Street in front of the Blackall Cultural Centre. Blackall War Memorial and other memorials and honour rolls are located either within the park or within the cultural centre.

Blackall Woolscour is in Evora Road. Guided tours are available.

Transport 
Blackall Airport is on Aerodrome Road. QantasLink has services connecting the town to Longreach and Brisbane.

Blackall is also a timetabled meal stop for Bus Queensland's long-distance bus services:

 BQ201 (Brisbane – Mount Isa)
 BQ202 (Mount Isa – Brisbane)

Climate 

Blackall experiences a hot semi-arid climate (Köppen: BSh, Trewartha: BShl); with very hot summers with moderate rains; warm to hot, dry springs and autumns with occasional rains; and mild, dry winters with little rain.

Notable people

 Ashley Adams – Paralympic shooter
 Bonny Barry – Politician
 Jack "Jackie" Howe – Shearer
 Jacki MacDonald − Television and radio personality 
 Chris Nyst – Solicitor and crime fiction writer
 Edgar Towner – Recipient of the Victoria Cross

Gallery

See also

 Blackall Airport
 Shire of Blackall

References

External links

 University of Queensland: Queensland Places: Blackall and Blackall Shire

 
Towns in Queensland
Populated places established in 1868
Blackall-Tambo Region
1868 establishments in Australia
Localities in Queensland